Alfred Riedl (2 November 1949 – 8 September 2020) was an Austrian football player and manager. As a player he was a striker. His last coaching role was with the Indonesia national football team.

Playing career

Club career
He first played for FK Austria Wien, before leaving Austria to play for the Belgian club Sint-Truiden at the age of 22.  After he played eight seasons in the Belgian First Division (two with Sint-Truiden, two with Royal Antwerp and four with Standard Liège), Riedl enjoyed a brief spell at FC Metz in France. He came back to Austria after a single season there, to play for Grazer AK, and then at Wiener Sportclub and VfB Admira Wacker Mödling. He finished twice as top scorer of the Belgian First Division.

International career
Riedl was capped four times for the Austria national football team, making his debut in April 1975 against Hungary.

Coaching career
As a manager, Riedl has coached Olympique Khouribga (Morocco, 1993–94), Al-Zamalek (Egypt, 1994–95), Al Salmiya (Kuwait, 2001–03), and many national teams, including Austria (1990–92), Liechtenstein (1997–98), Palestine (2004–05), Vietnam (1998–2001, 2003–04, 2005–07), and Laos (2009–10). In the 2007 AFC Asian Cup, he has coached Vietnam to a 2–0 victory over UAE and help the team to get to the quarterfinal for the first time in history. Unfortunately, in late 2007, after the team's disappointing performance in the SEA Games 2007 competition, he was fired and replaced by the Portuguese coach Henrique Calisto. In October 2008, he returned to Vietnam to coach the Hải Phòng soccer club. However, after only three matches with poor performance, he was dismissed. On 9 July 2009, he signed a contract as head coach of Laos, the contract was for two years.

Indonesia
On 4 May 2010, Alfred Riedl was named the new coach of Indonesia's national and under-23 sides. He led the Indonesian national team to the 2010 AFF Suzuki Final but lost to Malaysia on 2–4 aggregate score. Then suddenly, on 13 July 2011, he lost his job because of a "contract dispute", after a highly publicized political power struggle within the Football Association of Indonesia (PSSI), and was replaced by Wim Rijsbergen.

After a return to Laos as technical director and Belgian club Visé as head of youth development, Riedl was reappointed as Indonesia national team head coach in December 2013, signing a 3-year contract. His contract was terminated by mutual consent at the end of 2014, after Indonesia failed to qualify for the knockout stages of the 2014 AFF Suzuki Cup. Riedl then accepted the head coach job of PSM Makassar in early 2015, but resigned in April the same year because of health issues, before the league even started.

Rield returned as the head coach of Indonesia in 2016 on a one-year contract, and this time he guided Indonesia to the finals of 2016 AFF Suzuki Cup, repeating his 2010 performance. After Indonesia lost to Thailand 2–3 on aggregate in the finals, his contract was not renewed by PSSI.

Death
Riedl died on 8 September 2020 in Austria due to cancer.

Honours

Player

Austria Wien

Austrian Football Championship: 1968–69, 1969–70
Austrian Cup: 1970–71

Grazer AK 

 Austrian Cup: 1980–81

Individual

Austrian Football Championship Top Scorer: 1971–72
Belgian First Division Top Scorer: 1972–73, 1974–75

Manager

Vietnam

AFF Championship runner-up: 1998
Southeast Asian Games runner-up: 1999
King's Cup runner-up: 2006

Vietnam Olympic

Southeast Asian Games runner-up: 2003, 2005

Indonesia

AFF Championship runner-up: 2010, 2016

References

External links
 Official page
Profile – Austria Archive
 
 Alfred Riedl Interview

1949 births
2020 deaths
Footballers from Vienna
Austrian footballers
Austria international footballers
FK Austria Wien players
Sint-Truidense V.V. players
Royal Antwerp F.C. players
Standard Liège players
FC Metz players
Grazer AK players
Austrian Football Bundesliga players
Belgian Pro League players
Ligue 1 players
Austrian expatriate footballers
Expatriate footballers in Belgium
Expatriate footballers in France
Austrian football managers
Wiener Sport-Club managers
Austria national football team managers
Expatriate football managers in Liechtenstein
Liechtenstein national football team managers
Expatriate football managers in Vietnam
Vietnam national football team managers
Expatriate football managers in Kuwait
Expatriate football managers in the State of Palestine
Palestine national football team managers
Expatriate football managers in Laos
Laos national football team managers
Expatriate football managers in Indonesia
Indonesia national football team managers
2007 AFC Asian Cup managers
Austrian expatriate football managers
Olympique Club de Khouribga managers
Association football forwards
PSM Makassar managers
Al-Salmiya SC managers
Kuwait Premier League managers
Austrian expatriate sportspeople in Kuwait
Austrian expatriate sportspeople in Liechtenstein
Austrian expatriate sportspeople in Vietnam
Austrian expatriate sportspeople in the State of Palestine
Austrian expatriate sportspeople in Belgium
Austrian expatriate sportspeople in Morocco
Austrian expatriate sportspeople in Laos
Austrian expatriate sportspeople in Egypt
Austrian expatriate sportspeople in France
Expatriate football managers in Egypt
Expatriate football managers in Morocco